Gunter Hadwiger (28 March 1949 – 9 December 2021) was an Austrian politician.

References

1949 births
2021 deaths
Freedom Party of Austria politicians
Place of death missing
People from Villach
21st-century Austrian politicians